Lundvik is a Swedish surname. Notable people with the surname include:

 Hildor Lundvik (1885–1951), Swedish composer
 John Lundvik (born 1983), Swedish singer

See also
 Lundvik, a fictional astronaut character played by Hermione Norris in "Kill the Moon" in the seventh episode of the eighth series of the British science fiction television programme Doctor Who.

Swedish-language surnames